Ismailovo (İsmail) is a rural locality (a selo) and the administrative centre of Ismailovsky Selsoviet, Dyurtyulinsky District, Bashkortostan, Russia. The population was 1,081 as of 2010. There are 20 streets.

Geography 
Ismailovo is located 18 km northwest of Dyurtyuli (the district's administrative centre) by road. Kuchergich is the nearest rural locality.

References 

Rural localities in Dyurtyulinsky District